Charlese Antoinette Jones is an American costume designer for film and television. She is best known for her work on Raising Dion, Astronomy Club: The Sketch Show and Judas and the Black Messiah.

Career
Charlese began her costume designer career as an intern on Solitary Man in 2009. She made her debut as a costume designer with the feature film Newlyweeds, directed by Shaka King in 2013. She is a member of the Academy of Motion Picture Arts and Sciences, which awards the Oscar and a member of the Costume Designers Guild. She is the founder of the Black Designer Database.

Filmography

 2023 - AIR
 2022 - I Wanna Dance with Somebody
 2022 - Nanny
 2021 - Judas and the Black Messiah
 2019 - Astronomy Club: The Sketch Show
 2019 - Raising Dion
 2019 - See You Yesterday
 2018 - Ride

 2018 - Sprinter
 2016 - Sticky Notes
 2016 - Vincent N Roxxy
 2016 - Little Boxes
 2015 - Addicted to Fresno
 2013 - The Inevitable Defeat of Mister & Pete
 2013 - Newlyweeds

Awards and nominations

References

External links
 
 

American costume designers
Women costume designers
American fashion designers
American women fashion designers
Living people
21st-century American women
Year of birth missing (living people)
Place of birth missing (living people)